The III Bolivarian Games (Spanish: Juegos Bolivarianos) were a multi-sport event held between December 5–21, 1951, at the Estadio Olímpico de la Universidad Central de Venezuela in Caracas, Venezuela.  The Games were organized by the Bolivarian Sports Organization (ODEBO).

The Games were officially opened by Germán Suárez Flamerich, who became president of the "Junta de Gobierno" 1950-1952, after the assassination of Carlos Delgado Chalbaud.

A detailed history of the early editions of the Bolivarian Games between 1938 and 1989 was published in a book written (in Spanish) by José Gamarra Zorrilla, former president of the Bolivian Olympic Committee, and first president (1976-1982) of ODESUR.  Gold medal winners from Ecuador were published by the Comité Olímpico Ecuatoriano.

Participation 
A total of 1010 athletes from 6 countries were reported to participate:

Sports 
The local Organizing Committee included three popular Venezuelan sports (Basque pelota, Bolas criollas, and Coleo) as exhibition events. The following sports were explicitly mentioned:

Aquatic sports
 Diving
 Swimming
 Water polo
 Athletics
 Baseball
 Basketball
 Basque pelota†
 Billiards
 Bolas criollas†
 Boxing
 Chess
 Coleo†
Cycling
 Road cycling
 Track cycling
 Equestrian
 Fencing
 Football
 Golf
 Modern pentathlon
 Shooting
 Table tennis
 Tennis
 Volleyball
 Weightlifting
 Wrestling

†: Exhibition event.

The list might be incomplete.

Medal count
The medal count for these Games is tabulated below.
This table is sorted by the number of gold medals earned by each country.  The number of silver medals is taken into consideration next, and then the number of bronze medals.

References 

Bolivarian Games
S
Bolivarian Games
Bolivarian Games
B
Sports competitions in Caracas
Multi-sport events in Venezuela
20th century in Caracas
December 1951 sports events in South America